The Angeline Champeau Rioux House is located in Howard, Wisconsin.

History
The house was constructed around a log cabin that had been built roughly seventy years earlier. Later, it was used by Fort Howard and may have been a stop of the Underground Railroad. It was added to the State and the National Register of Historic Places in 1994.

See also
List of the oldest buildings in Wisconsin

References

Houses on the National Register of Historic Places in Wisconsin
National Register of Historic Places in Brown County, Wisconsin
Victorian architecture in Wisconsin